Interrhodeus is a genus of mites in the family Rhodacaridae. There is a single species in this genus, Interrhodeus brevicornus.

References

Rhodacaridae